Vincenzo Scotti (born 16 September 1933) is an Italian politician and member of Christian Democracy (DC). He was Minister of the Interior and Minister of Foreign Affairs.

Biography
Born in Naples, he graduated in economics at the Università di Roma La Sapienza in 1955.

In his early career he was responsible for the Centre for Research of the Workers union CISL. In 1968 Scotti was elected as Deputy for the Christian Democracy in the Italian Parliament. Later he was Minister for Cultural Assets and Activities (1981–82), member of the Finance Commission to the House of Deputies, Undersecretary of State to the Ministry of Budget, Labour Minister, Minister for Coordination of European Community Policies, Minister of Art and Cultural Heritage and the Environment, Minister of Civil Protections, and President of the Parliamentary Group for the Christian Democrats to the House of Deputies (the largest group of the Italian parliament with 230 deputies). He was elected Mayor of Naples in 1984.

During his term as Minister of Interior (1990-1992) laws which permitted police authorities and magistrates to act against the Mafia organisation Camorra were promulgated. In collaboration with judge Giovanni Falcone and US attorney Rudy Giuliani, he founded the DIA (Direzione Investigativa Antimafia), a specialised anti-mafia police force.

As Minister of Foreign Affairs, he participated in the G7 Summit in Munich in 1992, and represented the Prime Minister in the meetings of the heads of governments of the CSCE. During the arms embargo of Yugoslavia and as president of the UEO he was responsible for organisation of patrols of international waters by Italian armed forces.

He was cofounder of Fondazione Valenzi, an institution culturally and socially active created in memory of the ancient mayor of Naples Maurizio Valenzi.

Teaching career
From 1969 to 1995 he taught at the LUISS, a private university in Rome, Italy as professor of Development Economics. Currently, he is President of Link Campus University, an Italian private university.

On 27 April 2019 he was accused by Mueller investigation target George Papadopoulos of having been involved in “setting him [Papadopoulos] up.”

Legal issues
Scotti was one of the most important DC figures in Campania. In the 1980s, together with many other members of the party, he was involved in a financial scandal which followed reconstruction after the 1980 Irpinia earthquake, but avoided judgement due to the statute of limitations. Together with that of Antonio Gava, his name was mentioned in the kidnapping and liberation of DC member Ciro Cirillo by the Italian Red Brigades terrorist group in 1981. Scotti allegedly met Camorra boss Raffaele Cutolo in the prison at Ascoli Piceno to make arrangements for the ransom to be paid with Camorra money.

Scotti was accused of corruption in scandals regarding garbage management and construction projects for the 1990 Football World Cup, but was finally acquitted of all charges. Italy's Court of Accounts sentenced him to pay €2,995,450 for having the Italian state buy a building in Rome at an inflated price, in order to create cash for SISDE, Italy's secret service.

References

Behan, Tom (2002), See Naples and Die: The Camorra and Organized Crime, London/New York: I.B. Tauris Publishers, 
Stille, Alexander (1995). Excellent Cadavers. The Mafia and the Death of the First Italian Republic, New York: Vintage 
   

1933 births
Living people
Politicians from Naples
Foreign ministers of Italy
Culture ministers of Italy
Italian Ministers of the Interior
Italian Roman Catholics
Christian Democracy (Italy) politicians
20th-century Italian politicians